Magomed Eldarovich Ramazanov (born 22 May 1993 in Dagestan) is a Russian-born Romanian freestyle wrestler of Avar heritage. World cup 2019 winner, Russian nationals 2019 3rd, European 
Championships 2020 runner up at 79 kg.

Background and career

Magomed Ramazanov was born in little village Oktyaborskoe which located close to Khasavyurt, Dagestan. Started training in wrestling at the age of seven. He trained in different places, in Astrakhan under Khaibula Abdulaev, in Moscow under Ikhaku Gaiderbekov. The first big achievement came to him at the Ziolkowski International 2018, at the 79 kg, he placed 1st and didn't give up a single point, in the final match he beat Georgian 2012 Olympian Davit Khutsishvili. At the Russian nationals 2019 he placed 3rd. In August 2019 at the Alexander Medved tournament in Minsk, Belarus he won a gold medal. At the Golden Grand Prix Ivan Yarygin 2020 he came in first, in the final match he over world bronze medalist Akhmed Gadzhimagomedov of Russia. At the European Championships 2020 he faced countryman Magomedkhabib Kadimagomedov in the final match, where he lost by decision.

Ramazanov has been representing CSKA wrestling club which based in Moscow since 2019, under wrestling coach Vadim Biyaz.

Championships and accomplishments
2016 Intercontinental cup – 1st. (74 kg, Khasavyurt, Russia)
2018 Ziolkowski International – 1st. (79 kg, Warsaw, Poland)
2019 World Cup – 1st. (Yakutsk, Russia)
2019 Ali Aliyev Memorial – 1st. (79 kg, Kaspiysk, Russia)
2020 Ivan Yarygin – 1st. (79 kg, Krasnoyarsk, Russia)
2020 European Championships – 2nd. (79 kg, Rome, Italy)

Personal life
He has young brother Ramazan Ramazanov, who represents Bulgaria at the international level. Magomed became popular on social networks among MMA fans because he looks like a lightweight UFC champion Khabib Nurmagomedov.

References

1993 births
Living people
People from Khasavyurtovsky District
Russian male sport wrestlers
Russian Muslims
European Wrestling Championships medalists
Sportspeople from Dagestan